The Blues Is Now is a 1967 studio album by the American singer Jimmy Witherspoon, accompanied by organist Jack McDuff.

Reception

Thomas Ward reviewed the album for Allmusic and described The Blues Is Now as "arguably the finest" of Witherspoon's Verve albums and described his voice as "...in top form and hugely expressive. ...A light-night blues classic, this is Witherspoon at his most relaxed and assured and is a joy to listen to".

Track listing
 "Sweet Slumber" (Lucky Millinder, Al J. Neiburg, Henri Woode) - 3:53
 "I'm Gonna Move to the Outskirts of Town" (Andy Razaf, Will Weldon) - 2:48
 "Past Forty Blues" (Robert Lee Roach, Jimmy Witherspoon) - 4:23
 "S.K. Blues" (Saunders King) - 2:25
 "Late One Evening" (Witherspoon) - 3:03
 "Part Time Woman" (Witherspoon) - 3:31
 "Good Rocking Tonight" (Roy Brown) - 2:17
 "I Won't Tell a Soul (I Love You)" (Hughie Clark, Ross Parker) - 5:20
 "My Baby's Quit Me" (Doc Pomus) - 3:12
 "My Money's Long This Morning, Baby" (David Parker) - 2:11

Personnel
 Jimmy Witherspoon - vocals
 Jack McDuff - arranger, organ
 Leo Johnson, Danny Turner - alto saxophone, tenor saxophone, flute
 Melvin Sparks - guitar
 Jymie Merritt - bass guitar
 Ray Appleton - drums

Production
 Hollis King - art direction
 Lew Futterman - producer
 Nancy Reiner - cover art
 Acy Lehman - cover design
 Val Valentin - engineer
 Ken Druker - executive producer
 Bob Irwin - mastering
 Jayme Pieruzzi - mastering
 Raymond Ross - photography
 Bryan Koniarz - reissue producer

References

1967 albums
Jimmy Witherspoon albums
Verve Records albums